The Justice and Development Front, sometimes translated as the Front for Justice and Development, is an Islamist political party in Algeria led by Abdallah Djaballah. Djaballah is the former leader of the Movement for National Reform.

The party was inspired by Turkey's Justice and Development Party (AKP).

References

2011 establishments in Algeria
Islamic political parties in Algeria
Nationalist parties in Algeria
Political parties established in 2011
Political parties in Algeria
Social conservative parties